Remington House is a historic home located at Kinne Corners in Herkimer County, New York. It is a -story, rectangular, gable-roofed dwelling constructed of locally quarried fieldstone.  It was built about 1810 (1799 according to the historical marker) by Eliphalet Remington and occupied by the Remington family during the formative period of their firearms manufacturing enterprises, Remington Arms.

It was listed on the National Register of Historic Places in 1997.

References

Houses on the National Register of Historic Places in New York (state)
Federal architecture in New York (state)
Houses completed in 1810
Houses in Herkimer County, New York
National Register of Historic Places in Herkimer County, New York